Evan Shaw Parker (born 5 April 1944) is a British tenor and soprano saxophone player who plays free improvisation.

Recording and performing prolifically with many collaborators, Parker was a pivotal figure in the development of European free jazz and free improvisation. He has pioneered or substantially expanded an array of extended techniques. Critic Ron Wynn describes Parker as "among Europe's most innovative and intriguing saxophonists...his solo sax work isn't for the squeamish."

Early influences 
Parker's original inspiration was Paul Desmond, and in recent years the influence of cool jazz saxophone players has again become apparent in his music — there are tributes to Warne Marsh and Lee Konitz on Time Will Tell (ECM, 1993) and Chicago Solo (Okka Disk, 1997). He soon discovered the music of John Coltrane, who would be the primary influence throughout his career. Other important early influences were Cecil Taylor, Albert Ayler and Jimmy Guiffre.

Early career 
Parker moved to London in 1966 and quickly became a part of the city’s improvised music scene based around the Little Theatre Club, joining John Stevens’ Spontaneous Music Ensemble. Along with guitarist Derek Bailey, he quickly became a leading figure in the improvised music movement in London and throughout Europe. One of his most lasting connections was with German pianist Alexander von Schlippenbach, whose trio he joined in 1970.

Solo soprano saxophone music 

Parker is perhaps best known for his solo performances. Originally dismissive of solo performance as being too close in nature to traditional composition, he was inspired to experiment with solo performance by the possibilities for musician-instrument interaction demonstrated by Derek Bailey’s solo guitar improvisations. Primarily using the soprano saxophone for these solo performances, the music makes use of a principle known as auditory streaming, where the use of wide registers creates the illusion of polyphony, which Parker terms “pseudo-polyphony”. This effect is achieved primarily by using multiphonics or harmonics in combination with circular breathing, polyrhythmic fingering, and split tonguing.

Electronic music 
Working with electronic music since the early days of the Spontaneous Music Ensemble or with his duo with Paul Lytton, Parker has become increasingly interested in electronics, usually through inviting collaborators such as Phil Wachsmann, Walter Prati, Joel Ryan, Lawrence Casserley, Sam Pluta or Matthew Wright to process his playing electronically, creating a feedback loop and shifting soundscape. His various Electro-Acoustic Ensembles in particular are a showcase for this area of his work.

Later career and recordings 

Parker has recorded a large number of albums both solo or as a group leader, and has recorded or performed with Peter Brötzmann, Michael Nyman, John Stevens, Derek Bailey, Keith Rowe, Joe McPhee, Anthony Braxton, Cecil Taylor, John Zorn, Fred Frith, Bill Laswell, Ikue Mori, Thurston Moore, Cyro Baptista, Milford Graves, George E. Lewis, Tim Berne, Mark Dresser, Dave Holland, Sylvie Courvoisier, and many others. Two key associations have been pianist Alexander von Schlippenbach's trio with Parker and drummer Paul Lovens (documented on recordings such as Pakistani Pomade and Elf Bagatellen) and a trio with bassist Barry Guy and drummer Paul Lytton. On Parker's 50th birthday, these two bands played a set apiece at a London concert; the results were issued by Leo Records as the 50th Birthday Concert.

Parker, Bailey, and Tony Oxley founded Incus Records in 1970. The label continued under Bailey's sole control after a falling-out between the two men in the early 1980s. Parker curates Psi Records, which is issued by Martin Davidson's Emanem Records.

From 1999 to 2007 Parker co-ordinated, recorded and played in the Free Zone at the Appleby Jazz Festival, held in Cumbria, England. The recordings were issued through his Psi record label.

Although Parker's focus is free improvisation, he has appeared in conventional jazz contexts, such as Charlie Watts's big band and Kenny Wheeler's ensembles and participated in Gavin Bryars's recording After the Requiem, performing the composition "Alaric I or II" as part of a saxophone quartet.

Parker contributed to David Sylvian's albums Manafon and Died in the Wool.

Pop music 
He also has appeared in pop-music contexts: on Scott Walker's Climate of Hunter, and on dubesque albums with Jah Wobble, the adventurous drum n bass duo Spring Heel Jack and rock group Spiritualized. He appeared on the b-side to Vic Reeves and The Wonderstuff's UK 1991 number-one hit "Dizzy", performing saxophone on "Oh, Mr Songwriter" (based on Vic Reeves Big Night Out TV show end theme song). At one point during a sax solo, Vic can be heard shouting: "Pack it in, Parker!"

Parker has also made notable appearances on record with Robert Wyatt.

Gallery 
Evan Parker playing in Aarhus, Denmark, 2010

Discography

As leader/co-leader 
 The Topography of the Lungs (Incus, 1970) with Derek Bailey and Han Bennink
The Music Improvisation Company 1968-1971 (Incus, 1968–70 [1976]) with Derek Bailey, Hugh Davies and Jamie Muir
 The Music Improvisation Company (ECM, 1970) with Derek Bailey, Hugh Davies, Jamie Muir and Christine Jeffrey
 Collective Calls (Urban) (Two Microphones) (Incus, 1972) with Paul Lytton 
 At the Unity Theatre (Incus, 1975) with Paul Lytton
 Saxophone Solos (Incus, 1976)
 Monoceros (Incus, 1978)
 Six of One (Incus, 1980)
 Incision with Barry Guy (FMP, 1980)
 Tracks (Incus, 1983)
 Hook, Drift & Shuffle (Incus, 1985)
 The Snake Decides (Incus, 1986)
 Atlanta (Impetus, 1990)
 Process and Reality (FMP, 1991)
 Three Blokes (FMP, 1992 [1994]) with Lol Coxhill and Steve Lacy
 Conic Sections (AhUm, 1993)
 Synergenics - Phonomanie III (Leo, 1993)
 Birmingham Concert (Rare Music, 1993 [1996])
 Imaginary Values with Barry Guy and Paul Lytton (Maya, 1994)
 50th Birthday Concert (Leo, 1994)
 Obliquities with Barry Guy (Maya, 1995)
 The Redwood Session (CIMP, 1995) with Joe McPhee
 Breaths and Heartbeats with Barry Guy and Paul Lytton (Rastacan, 1995)
 McPhee/Parker/Lazro (Vand'Oeuvre, 1996) with Joe McPhee and Daunik Lazro
 Tempranillo (Nova Era, 1996) with Agustí Fernández
 Chicago Solo (Okka Disk, 1995)
 London Air Lift (FMP, 1996)
 At the Vortex with Barry Guy and Paul Lytton (Emanem, 1996)
 Toward the Margins (ECM, 1996)
 Monkey Puzzle (Leo, 1997) with Ned Rothenberg
 Natives and Aliens (Leo, 1997) with Barry Guy, Paul Lytton, and Marilyn Crispell
 Unity Variations (Okka Disk, 1999) with Georg Gräwe
 Drawn Inward (ECM, 1999)
 Foxes Fox (Emanem, 1999) with Steve Beresford, John Edwards, and Louis Moholo
 After Appleby (Leo, 2000) with Barry Guy, Paul Lytton, and Marilyn Crispell
 Lines Burnt in Light (Psi, 2001)
 Passage to Hades (30Hz, 2001) with Jah Wobble
 The Ayes Have It (Emanem, 2001)
 Chicago Tenor Duets (Okka Disk, 2002) with Joe McPhee
 Memory/Vision (ECM, 2002)
 Set (Psi, 2003)
 The Eleventh Hour (ECM, 2004)
 Boustrophedon (ECM, 2004)
 The Bishop's Move (Les Disques Victo, 2004)
 Crossing the River (Psi, 2005)
 Time Lapse (Tzadik, 2006)
 Zafiro (Maya, 2006)
 The Moment's Energy (ECM, 2007)
 A Glancing Blow (Clean Feed, 2007) with John Edwards, Chris Corsano
 Whitstable Solo (Psi, 2008)
 House Full of Floors (Tzadik, 2009)
 Psalms (Psi, 2010) with Sten Sandell
 Scenes in the House of Music (Clean Feed, 2010)
 Nightwork (Marge, 2010)
 Round About One O'Clock (Not Two, 2011) with Zlatko Kaucic
 The Bleeding Edge (Psi, 2011) with Okkyung Lee, Peter Evans
 The Voice is One (Not Two, 2012) with Agustí Fernández
 Hasselt (Psi, 2012)
 Dortmund Variations (Nuscope, 2012) with Georg Gräwe
 Rex, Wrecks & XXX (RogueArt, 2013) with Matthew Shipp
 Live at Maya Recording Festival (NoBusiness, 2013)
 Rocket Science (More is More, 2013)
 What/If/They Both Could Fly (Rune Grammofon, 2013) with Joe McPhee
 Either Or And (Relative Pitch, 2014) with Sylvie Courvoisier
 Seven (Victo, 2014)
 Extremes (Red Toucan, 2014) with Paul Dunmall, Tony Bianco
 Ninth Square (Clean Feed, 2015) with Joe Morris, Nate Wooley

As sideman 
With Derek Bailey
The London Concert (Incus, 1976)
Compatibles (Incus, 1986)
With Han Bennink
The Grass is Greener (Psi, 2000)
With Borah Bergman
The Fire Tale (Soul Note, 1994)
With Paul Bley
Time Will Tell (ECM, 1994)
Sankt Gerold (ECM, 2000)
With Anthony Braxton
Ensemble (Victoriaville) 1988 (Victo, 1988 [1992])
Duo (London) 1993 (Leo, 1993)
Trio (London) 1993 (Leo, 1993)
With Peter Brötzmann
Machine Gun (FMP, 1968)
Nipples (Calig, 1969)
Fuck de Boere (Atavistic, 2001) recorded in 1968 and 1970
With Gavin Bryars
After the Requiem (ECM, 1991)
With Lawrence Casserley
Solar Wind (Touch, 1997)
Dividuality (Maya, 1997)
With Alvin Curran
In Real Time (Ictus, 1978)
With Pierre Favre
Pierre Favre Quartet (Wergo, 1970)
With Joe Gallivan
Innocence (Cadence, 1992)
With the Globe Unity Orchestra
Hamburg 1974 (FMP, 1974)
Rumbling (FMP, 1976)
Pearls (FMP, 1977)
Jahrmarkt/Local Fair (Po Torch, 1977)
Improvisations (JAPO, 1978)
Compositions (JAPO 1979)
 Intergalactic Blow (JAPO, 1982)
 20th Anniversary (FMP, 1986)
 Globe Unity 2002 (Intakt, 2002)
With Barry Guy/The London Jazz Composers' Orchestra
Ode (Incus, 1972)
Study II/Stringer (Intakt, 1980–91)
Stringer (1984)
Zurich Concerts (Intakt, 1987–88)
Harmos (Intakt, 1989)
Double Trouble (Intakt, 1990)
Theoria (Intakt, 1991)
Portraits (Intakt, 1993)
Three Pieces for Orchestra (Intakt, 1995)
Double Trouble Two (Intakt, 1998)
Radio Rondo/Schaffhausen Concert (Intakt, 2009)
That Time (Not Two, 2020)
With the Barry Guy New Orchestra
 Inscape–Tableaux (Intakt, 2001)
 Oort–Entropy (Intakt, 2005)
With Paul Haines
Darn It! (American Clavé, 1993)
With Dave Holland
Uncharted Territories (Dare2, 2018)
With Tony Hymas - Barney Bush
Left for Dead (nato, 1995)
With Steve Lacy
Saxophone Special (Emanem, 1975)
Chirps (FMP, 1985)
Three Blokes with Lol Coxhill (FMP, 1994)
With Chris McGregor
Chris McGregor Septet. Up to Earth, 1969 (Fledg'ling, 2008)
Chris McGregor's Brotherhood of Breath Travelling Somewhere, 1973 (Cuneiform, 2001)
Chris McGregor's Brotherhood of Breath Live at Willisau, 1973 (Ogun, 1974)
Chris McGregor's Brotherhood of Breath Procession (Ogun, 1978)
Chris McGregor's Brotherhood of Breath Bremen to Bridgwater, 1971 and 1975 (Cuneiform, 2004)
With Roscoe Mitchell
Composition/Improvisation Nos. 1, 2 & 3 (ECM, 2004)
With Louis Moholo
Spirits Rejoice! (Ogun, 1978)
Bush Fire (Ogun, 1995)
With The Music Improvisation Company
The Music Improvisation Company (ECM, 1970)
The Music Improvisation Company 1968-1971 (Incus, 1976)
With Michael Nyman
Michael Nyman (Piano, 1981)
With Tony Oxley
The Baptised Traveller (CBS, 1969)
4 Compositions for Sextet (CBS, 1970)
Ichnos (RCA, 1971)
Tony Oxley (Incus, 1975)
With Jean-François Pauvros
Master Attack (nato, 1987)
With Eddie Prévost
Most Materiall (Matchless, 1997)
With Paul Rutherford and Iskra 1912
 Sequences 72 & 73 (Emanem, 1997)
With Alexander von Schlippenbach
Pakistani Pomade (FMP, 1973)
Three Nails Left (FMP, 1975)
The Hidden Peak (FMP, 1977)
Detto fra de Noi (Po Torch, 1982)
Anticlockwise (FMP, 1983)
Das Hohe Lied (Po Torch, 1991)
Elf Bagatellen (FMP, 1991)
 The Morlocks and Other Pieces (FMP, 1994) with the Berlin Contemporary Jazz Orchestra
Physics (FMP, 1996)
 Live in Japan '96 (DIW, 1997)  with the Berlin Contemporary Jazz Orchestra
Complete Combustion (FMP, 1998)
Swinging the Bim (FMP, 1998)
Gold is Where You Find It (Intakt, 2007)
With Manfred Schoof
European Echoes (FMP, 1969)
With Setoladimaiale Unit
Live at Angelica 2018 (Setola di Maiale, 2019)
With the Spontaneous Music Ensemble
Karyobin (Island, 1968)
Quintessence (Emanem, 1974 [1986])
With Spring Heel Jack
Masses (Thirsty Ear, 2001)
Amassed (Thirsty Ear, 2002)
Live (Thirsty Ear, 2003)
The Sweetness of the Water (Thirsty Ear, 2004)
With John Stevens
Corner to Corner (Ogun, 1993)
With David Sylvian
Manafon (Samadhi Sound, 2009)
Died In The Wool (Samadhi Sound, 2011)
with Cecil Taylor
The Hearth (FMP, 1988)
Alms/Tiergarten (Spree) (FMP, 1988)
Melancholy (FMP, 1990)Nailed (FMP, 1990)
With Stan TraceySuspensions and Anticipations (Psi, 2003)
With Scott WalkerClimate of Hunter (Virgin, 1984)
With Charlie WattsVol pour Sidney (nato, 1991)
With Kenny WheelerSong for Someone (Incus, 1973)Around 6 (ECM, 1979)Music for Large & Small Ensembles (ECM, 1990)
With Robert WyattShleep'' (Hannibal, 1997)

References

External links 

 Official site
 Discography, interviews, mp3 samples
  Projects, releases
 Discography by Patrice Roussel and William Hsu

1944 births
Living people
20th-century British male musicians
20th-century British musicians
20th-century saxophonists
21st-century British male musicians
21st-century saxophonists
Avant-garde jazz musicians
Avant-garde saxophonists
Berlin Contemporary Jazz Orchestra members
British jazz soprano saxophonists
British male jazz musicians
British male saxophonists
Musicians_from_Bristol
Brotherhood of Breath members
Clean Feed Records artists
English jazz saxophonists
Free improvisation
Globe Unity Orchestra members
Incus Records artists
Intakt Records artists
Leo Records artists
NoBusiness Records artists
RogueArt artists
Rune Grammofon artists
Spontaneous Music Ensemble members
The Dedication Orchestra members
Tzadik Records artists
Okka Disk artists
Emanem Records artists